Rhododendron strigillosum (芒刺杜鹃) is a rhododendron species native to Sichuan and Yunnan in China, where it grows at altitudes of . The flowers are red or white.

It flowers too early (March-April) to be reliable in climates with extensive frosts, and is therefore not often seen in general cultivation.

References

"Rhododendron strigillosum", Franchet, Bull. Soc. Bot. France. 33: 232. 1886.

strigillosum